Bad Country (also known as Whiskey Bay) is a 2014 American crime drama film based on a true story starring Matt Dillon, Willem Dafoe, Amy Smart, and Tom Berenger. The film started shooting in Baton Rouge and Angola, Louisiana on August 7, 2012.

Plot
When Baton Rouge police detective Bud Carter arrests contract killer Jesse Weiland, he convinces Jesse to help the police to destroy the South's most powerful crime ring. When the syndicate orders Carter's death and Weiland is identified as an informant, the two team up to fight the mob and catch the crime boss who ordered the hit.

Production
The film was in post-production when director Chris Brinker died suddenly on February 8, 2013. Brinker was to be presented with the Robert Smalls Indie Vision Award at the 7th annual Beaufort, South Carolina International Film Festival in February 2013.

Cast
 Matt Dillon as Jesse Weiland
 Willem Dafoe as Bud Carter
 Tom Berenger as Lutin
 Amy Smart as Lynn Weiland
 Bill Duke as John Nokes
 Neal McDonough as Kiersey
 Kevin Chapman as Morris
 Christopher Denham as Tommy Weiland
 Chris Marquette as Fitch
 Don Yesso as Captain Bannock
 Alex Solowitz as Buzz McKinnnon
 John Edward Lee as Catfish Stanton
 Jean Moolman as Hank Jones

References

External links
 
 

2014 films
2014 crime drama films
2014 crime action films
2014 independent films
American crime drama films
American crime action films
American independent films
Crime films based on actual events
Films set in 1983
Films shot in Louisiana
Films scored by Jeff Danna
2010s English-language films
2010s American films